The John Fritz Medal has been awarded annually since 1902 by the American Association of Engineering Societies (AAES) for "outstanding scientific or industrial achievements". The medal was created for the 80th birthday of John Fritz, who lived between 1822 and 1913.  When AAES was dissolved in 2020, the administration of the Fritz medal was transferred to the American Institute of Mining, Metallurgical, and Petroleum Engineers (AIME), and is currently coordinated by AIME member society, the Society of Mining, Metallurgy, & Exploration (SME).

Background 
The John Fritz Medal is often described as the "Nobel Prize for engineering." This prestigious award is given annually for notable scientific or industrial achievements. It is granted to living people, but also posthumous. Since its initiation in 1902, there were six years when it was not awarded.

The John Fritz Medal board once consisted of sixteen representatives is four national societies in the fields of civil engineering, mining, metallurgical engineering, mechanical engineering and electrical engineering.

Among the most notable winners are Thomas Edison, Lord Kelvin, Alexander Graham Bell, George Westinghouse, Orville Wright, Charles F. "Boss" Kettering, Claude Shannon, Robert Noyce and Gordon Moore.

Recipients 
 
 2021 Elon Musk
 2020 No award
 2019 No award
 2018 Anne S. Kiremidjian
 2017 Frank Kreith
 2016 H. Vincent Poor
 2015 Jon D. Magnusson
 2014 Julia Weertman
 2013 Gregory Stephanopoulos
 2012 Leslie E. Robertson
 2011 Andrew J. Viterbi
 2010 Gerald J. Posakony
 2009 Yvonne Claeys Brill
 2008 Kristina M. Johnson
 2007 Gavriel Salvendy
 2006 No award
 2005 George Tamaro
 2004 John A. Swanson
 2003 Robert S. Langer
 2002 Daniel S. Goldin
 2001 Paul C. W. Chu
 2000 John W. Fisher
 1999 George H. Heilmeier
 1998 Ivan A. Getting
 1997 Arthur E. Humphrey
 1996 George N. Hatsopoulos
 1995 Lynn S. Beedle
 1994 Hoyt C. Hottel
 1993 Gordon E. Moore
 1992 Serge Gratch
 1991 Hunter Rouse
 1990 Gordon A. Cain
 1989 Robert N. Noyce
 1988 Ralph B. Peck
 1987 Ralph Landau
 1986 Simon Ramo
 1985 Daniel C. Drucker
 1984 Kenneth A. Roe
 1983 Claude Elwood Shannon
 1982 David Packard
 1981 Ian MacGregor
 1980 T. Louis Austin, Jr.
 1979 Nathan M. Newmark
 1978 Robert G. Heitz
 1977 George R. Brown
 1976 Thomas O. Paine
 1975 Manson Benedict
 1974 H. I. Romnes
 1973 Lyman Dwight Wilbur
 1972 William Webster
 1971 Patrick E. Haggerty
 1970 Glenn B. Warren
 1969 Michael Lawrence Haider
 1968 Igor Ivan Sikorsky
 1967 Walker L. Cisler
 1966 Warren K. Lewis
 1965 Frederick Kappel
 1964 Lucius D. Clay
 1963 Hugh L. Dryden
 1962 Crawford H. Greenewalt
 1961 Stephen D. Bechtel
 1960 Gwilym A. Price
 1959 Mervin J. Kelly
 1958 John R. Suman
 1957 Ben Moreell
 1956 Philip Sporn
 1955 Harry Alonzo Winne
 1954 William Embry Wrather
 1953 Benjamin F. Fairless
 1952 Ervin George Bailey
 1951 Vannevar Bush
 1950 Walter H. Aldridge
 1949 Charles Metcalf Allen
 1948 Theodore von Karman
 1947 Lewis Warrington Chubb
 1946 Zay Jeffries
 1945 John Lucian Savage
 1944 Charles F. Kettering
 1943 Willis Rodney Whitney
 1942 Everette Lee DeGolyer
 1941 Ralph Budd
 1940 Clarence Floyd Hirshfeld (posthumous)
 1939 Frank Baldwin Jewett
 1938 Paul Dyer Merica
 1937 Arthur Newell Talbot
 1936 William Frederick Durand
 1935 Frank Julian Sprague (posthumous)
 1934 John Ripley Freeman (posthumous)
 1933 Daniel Cowan Jackling
 1932 Mihajlo Idvorski Pupin
 1931 David Watson Taylor
 1930 Ralph Modjeski
 1929 Herbert Clark Hoover
 1928 John Joseph Carty
 1927 Elmer Ambrose Sperry 
 1926 Edward Dean Adams
 1925 John Frank Stevens
 1924 Ambrose Swasey
 1923 Guglielmo Marconi
 1922 Charles P. E. Schneider
 1921 Sir Robert Hadfield
 1920 Orville Wright
 1919 Gen. George W. Goethals
 1918 J. Waldo Smith
 1917 Henry Marion Howe
 1916 Elihu Thomson
 1915 James Douglas
 1914 John Edson Sweet
 1913 No award
 1912 Robert Woolston Hunt
 1911 Sir William Henry White
 1910 Alfred Noble
 1909 Charles Talbot Porter
 1908 Thomas Alva Edison
 1907 Alexander Graham Bell
 1906 George Westinghouse
 1905 Lord Kelvin
 1904 No award
 1903 No award
 1902 John Fritz

See also
 List of engineering awards
 List of prizes named after people

References

Engineering awards
 
Awards established in 1902
1902 establishments in the United States